The Atiq Mosque in Benghazi, Libya, is one of the oldest and best known in the city.

The mosque, also known as Al-Jami al-Kabir (the Great Mosque), forms the north side of Freedom Square. The original structure dates to the early fifteenth century, and since then received many renovations. The present central-domed structure is Ottoman in design.

Gallery

See also
 Islam in Libya
 List of mosques in Libya

References

Further reading

Buildings and structures in Benghazi
Mosques in Libya